Patrick Robin Douglas MacHugh (born 29 March 1992) is a Scottish badminton player who played for the BC Tafers in Fribourg, Switzerland. He began playing badminton at aged ten, and selected to join national team in 2011. He competed at the 2014 and 2018 Commonwealth Games.

MacHugh educated marketing at the University of Strathclyde, in Glasgow, and also psychology at the Open University. He was awarded Sportsperson of the Year from the University of Strathclyde.

MacHugh has collected 4 international titles and winning 18 Scotland caps. He announced his retirement from full-time badminton in July 2018.

Achievements

BWF International Challenge/Series 
Men's doubles

  BWF International Challenge tournament
  BWF International Series tournament
  BWF Future Series tournament

References

External links 
 

1992 births
Living people
Sportspeople from Kirkcaldy
Scottish male badminton players
Badminton players at the 2018 Commonwealth Games
Badminton players at the 2014 Commonwealth Games
Commonwealth Games competitors for Scotland